Parliamentary elections were held in Yemen on 27 April 1993, the first after Yemeni unification. The General People's Congress emerged as the largest party, winning 123 of the 301 seats. Voter turnout was 84.8%.

Electoral system
The country continued to use the electoral system of North Yemen, with the 301 members of Parliament elected in single-member constituencies by first-past-the-post voting.

Results

References

External links
Election report Inter-Parliamentary Union

Elections in Yemen
1993 in Yemen
Yemen